Ukraine operates four nuclear power plants with 15 reactors located in Volhynia and South Ukraine. 
The total installed nuclear power capacity is over 13 GWe, ranking 7th in the world in 2020. Energoatom, a Ukrainian state enterprise, operates all four active nuclear power stations in Ukraine.
In 2019, nuclear power supplied over 20% of Ukraine's energy.

70 TWh of electricity generation was nuclear in 2020, which was over 50%. This was the 3rd largest share, only France and Slovakia had a higher share. The largest nuclear power plant in Europe is in Ukraine.

The 1986 Chernobyl disaster in Northern Ukraine was the world's most severe nuclear accident to date.

Lack of coal for Ukraine's coal-fired power stations due to the War in Donbas and a shut down of one of the six reactors of the Zaporizhzhia Nuclear Power Plant led to rolling blackouts throughout the country in December 2014. Due to the Russo-Ukrainian War, the nuclear power plant has been damaged.

Overview

Ukraine relies to a large extent on nuclear power. 
The largest nuclear power plant in Europe, the Zaporizhzhia Nuclear Power Plant, is located in Ukraine. 
In 2006, the government planned to build 11 new reactors by the year 2030, which would almost double the current amount of nuclear power capacity. 
Ukraine's power sector is the twelfth-largest in the world in terms of installed capacity, with 54 gigawatts (GW). 
Renewable energy still plays a very modest role in electrical output; in 2005 energy production was met by the following sources: nuclear (47%), thermal (45%), hydroelectric and other (8%).

History of Soviet origin

The Chernobyl disaster was a nuclear accident that occurred on 26 April 1986 at the Chernobyl Nuclear Power Plant in Ukrainian Soviet Socialist Republic of the Soviet Union.
An explosion and fire released large quantities of radioactive contamination into the atmosphere, which spread over much of Western USSR and Europe. 
It is considered the worst nuclear power plant accident in history, and is one of only two classified as a level 7 event on the International Nuclear Event Scale (the other being the Fukushima Daiichi nuclear disaster). The battle to contain the contamination and avert a greater catastrophe ultimately involved over 500,000 workers and cost an estimated 18 billion rubles, crippling the Soviet economy.

Ukraine used to receive its nuclear fuel exclusively from Russia by the Russian company TVEL. Since 2008 the country also gets nuclear fuel from Westinghouse. 
Since 2014 Westinghouse's share of imports grew to more than 30% in 2016 due to strong social disapproval of any economic relations with Russia after Crimea annexation. In 2018 Westinghouse's contract to supply VVER fuel was extended to 2025. Oil and natural gas provide the remainder of the country's energy; these are also imported from the former Soviet Union.

Recent renewal and transformation
In 2011 Energoatom began a project to bring safety into line with international standards at an estimated cost of $1.8 billion, with a target completion date of 2017. In 2015 the completion date was put back to 2020, due to financing delays. In 2015 some government agencies made corruption allegations against Energoatom, with concerns raised by Prime Minister Arseniy Yatsenyuk. In March 2016, Energoatom's assets and bank accounts were frozen by Ukrainian courts over allegedly unpaid debts; Energoatom appealed the decision, but the frozen finances led to contractual breaches. In June 2016 its bank accounts were unfrozen.

In February 2018 Ukraine secured $250 million of U.S. funding to build a spent nuclear fuel storage facility, which will avoid the need to ship spent nuclear fuel to Russia.

In 2018 Energoatom stated that electricity prices were too low to cover the cost of new nuclear fuel, and called for a price increase.

In 2008 Westinghouse Electric Company won a five-year contract selling nuclear fuel to three Ukrainian reactors starting in 2011. Following Euromaidan then President Viktor Yanukovych introduced a ban on Rosatom nuclear fuel shipments to Europe via Ukraine, which was in effect from 28 January until 6 March 2014. By 2016, Russia's share was down to 55 percent, Westinghouse supplying nuclear fuel for six of Ukraine's VVER-1000 nuclear reactors. After the Russian annexation of Crimea in April 2014, Energoatom and Westinghouse extended the contract for fuel deliveries through 2020.

In 2019 Energoatom and Turboatom signed a five year contract to modernize condensers and turbines at a number of Ukrainian nuclear power plants.

On 4 December 2019, Ukraine's government appointed Pavlo Pavlyshyn as acting head of Energoatom. During January 2020 Energoatom discussed eight legislative bills with the chairman of the Ukrainian parliament subcommittee on nuclear energy and safety, aimed at meeting international obligations and standards, and the financial stabilization of Energoatom.

In August 2021 Energoatom and Westinghouse signed a contract for construction of Westinghouse AP1000 reactors to replace the unfinished blocks in Khmelnitskyi power plant.

2022 
On 24 February 2022, the Ukrainian electricity grid disconnected from the post-Soviet IPS/UPS grid, ahead of synchronizing with the Synchronous grid of Continental Europe which was achieved on March 16.

In March 2022, Russian forces seized control of the Zaporizhzhia Nuclear Power Plant. It continues to operate and supply data, including from a remote monitoring system, to the International Atomic Energy Agency. On 6 June, IAEA Director General Rafael Grossi said "at least five of the seven indispensable pillars of nuclear safety and security have been compromised" in Russia's occupation of the plant, and after attacks in August, that all seven had been breached. Because of the 2022 Russian war against Ukraine, the nuclear power plant has been damaged.

Uranium mining
In 2005 there were 17 deposits on the state balance account. Three of them Vatutine, Central, and Michurinske were being developed, while an ore enrichment factory was being built at Novokostiantyniv. Number of deposits are exhausted (i.e. Devladove, Zhovtorichenske, Pershotravneve, Bratske).

Activists have been long alerting about Dnipro Chemical Plant in Kamianske, which is a Soviet-times military uranium processing facility that consists of industrial buildings, equipment containing uranium waste as well as large landfills where tailings were stored. Small scale soil, water and dust leaks have been documented from the facility, but apart from securing the perimeter not much has been done to properly secure the plant.

List of reactors

All of Ukraine's RBMK reactors (the type involved in the 1986 Chernobyl disaster) were located at the Chernobyl Nuclear Power Plant. All of the reactors there have been shut down, leaving only the much safer VVER reactors operating in the country. Three of the reactors listed were built in post-independence Ukraine, with the first one of these being constructed in 1995; the other sixteen reactors the country inherited from the Soviet Union.

Active plants with power generating capabilities

Research reactors

Unfinished and closed plants

See also 
 Nuclear energy policy in general
 Electricity sector in Ukraine
 List of power stations in Ukraine
 List of Chernobyl-related articles

References

External links 
 World-nuclear.org
 Nuclear Power Reactors

 
Industry in Ukraine
Energy in Ukraine